Gwent may refer to:

Places
Kingdom of Gwent, a post-Roman Welsh kingdom or principality which existed in various forms between about the 5th and 11th centuries, although the name continued in use later
Gwent (preserved county), a preserved county in Wales
Gwent (former administrative county), a Welsh local authority between 1974 and 1996
The operational area of Gwent Police
Gwent, a Celtic region which at one time covered part of modern-day Hampshire in England

People
Gwilym Gwent, adopted name of Welsh-born American composer William Aubrey Williams (1834–1891)
Richard Gwent (died 1543), a chaplain of King Henry VIII and official in the Church of England

Other uses
 Coleg Gwent, a further education college in Wales
A card game in The Witcher novels by Andrzej Sapkowski
 A card game in the 2015 video game The Witcher 3: Wild Hunt
 Gwent: The Witcher Card Game, a 2018 video game based on the card game

See also